A composer is someone, or something that composes a cohesive result by putting together two or more things, elements, or parts to form a whole. A composer typically refers to a person who creates or writes music.

Music
 Composer (album), a 1996 album by Cedar Walton
 "The Composer", a 1969 song by Diana Ross & the Supremes from the album Let the Sunshine In
 Rubato Composer, software that to compose music

Computing
 Composer (software), a dependency manager for the PHP programming language
 Mozilla Composer, a component of the Mozilla Web browser
 Netscape Composer, a WYSIWYG HTML editor

Other uses 
 Composer (role variant)
Chess composer

See also 
 Compose key